The Russian route R297 or the Amur Highway (so named after the nearby Amur River) is a federal highway in Russia, part of the Trans-Siberian Highway. The construction of the road united the Russian federal highways into a single system stretching from Saint Petersburg to Vladivostok. Before completion of the road, the Russian Pacific coast was connected to the rest of the country only by airlines, the Trans-Siberian Railway, and the Baikal–Amur Mainline.

, it still included unpaved sections. It traverses the sparsely populated regions of Zabaykalsky Krai, Amur Oblast, Jewish Autonomous Oblast, and Khabarovsk Krai.

Early history 
The most problematic stretch of the highway lies between Chita and Khabarovsk. The first section of this route, linking Belogorsk to Blagoveshchensk ( in length), was constructed by gulag inmates as early as 1949.

In 1966, the Council of Ministers of the Soviet Union ordered the construction of the -long Chita-Khabarovsk highway, which would run through permafrost-covered soil and mountainous areas. After a long feasibility study, construction began in 1978. The Soviet Road Troops began constructing the highway. Due to the difficulty of the natural conditions, after nearly 20 years of construction only  had been built, around Chita, Blagoveshchensk, and Khabarovsk. The road from Chita to Khabarovsk at that time, in the mid-1990s, consisted largely of undeveloped taiga glades that were passable only in winter.

On May 24, 1995, the government of the Russian Federation passed a resolution "On accelerating the construction of the Chita-Khabarovsk federal road." Shortly thereafter, another  of the highway was completed. In September 2001, the Russian Ministry of Transport increased funding for the project significantly in order to bring it toward completion, allocating 26% of the entire federal transportation budget to the highway. By 2002, the road became technically passable for the first time (with major difficulties, see next section), and 500-700 cars per day began to use it. As part of the Asian route AH31, the road completed the connection from Belogorsk to Dalian in China.

The Zilov Gap 
The section of the Chita–Khabarovsk road known as the Zilov Gap was largely unfinished until 2010 and was known during the semiannual mud seasons to be notoriously difficult to traverse. Traveling a distance of  could take as long as three hours, and the route involved numerous serious river crossings.

It posed a major challenge to long-distance overland expeditions and nearly caused the end of the Mondo Enduro expedition. The Long Way Round trip avoided it altogether. Motorcyclist Jim Oliver traveled the entire route in May–June 2004 and described massive marshes, gravel, rock, mud, sand, washboarding, potholes, stream fording, and detours along the elusive highway, with a noticeable absence of pavement. Many motorcyclists were injured or killed trying to "master" the Amur Highway.

To avoid the gap, drivers would typically load their cars onto the Trans-Siberian Railroad at Chernyshevsk for the 800-km trip to Magdagachi.

In 2010, the highway was paved, including the "Zilov Gap" section.

Completion of the highway 

In early 2004, Russian President Vladimir Putin symbolically opened the Amur Highway, with great swaths of forest separating major portions from one another. At this time, large sections of the highway were still dirt or crushed stone roads.

From 2008-2010, 35 billion rubles (roughly US$1.05 billion in 2009) were allocated to complete paving of the highway. The St. Petersburg Times reported in September 2010 that paving had been completed. At a videoconference marking the event, Putin described it as "a dependable, modern farm road, but not the Autobahn." Shortly afterward, a memorial marker for the "Zero kilometer of the Chita-Khabarovsk Federal Highway" was installed in Lenin Square, Khabarovsk, marking the final completion of the 40-year construction project.

Today, the Chita–Khabarovsk road is a modern paved highway with painted, reflective lane-lines.

Major junctions and cities traversed 

 Chita
 A360 Lena Highway to Yakutsk
 Birobidzhan
 Khabarovsk, via the Khabarovsk Bridge
 A370 highway to Vladivostok

Gallery

See also

References

Roads in Siberia